JWH-164 is a synthetic cannabinoid receptor agonist from the naphthoylindole family. It has approximately equal affinity for the CB1 and CB2 receptors, with a Ki of 6.6 nM at CB1 and 6.9 nM at CB2. JWH-164 is a positional isomer of the related compound JWH-081, but with a methoxy group at the 7-position of the naphthyl ring, rather than the 4-position as in JWH-081. Its potency is intermediate between that of JWH-081 and its ring unsubstituted derivative JWH-018, demonstrating that substitution of the naphthyl 7-position can also result in increased cannabinoid receptor binding affinity.

In the United States, all CB1 all receptor agonists of the 3-(1-naphthoyl)indole class, including JWH-164, are Schedule I Controlled Substances.

References 

JWH cannabinoids
Naphthoylindoles
Phenol ethers
CB1 receptor agonists
CB2 receptor agonists